Bavin may refer to:

People
 Jack Bavin (1921–2001), English footballer 
 Thomas Bavin (1874–1941), Australian politician
 Timothy John Bavin (born 1935), Bishop of Johannesburg
 Yuri Bavin, Russian footballer

Other
 Bavin ministry, government under Australian politician Thomas Bavin
 Bavin's Gulls, a group of islands in the River Thames, England
 Clark R. Bavin National Fish and Wildlife Forensic Laboratory in Ashland, Oregon, United States
 Bavin (wood) A log or bundle of long sticks; see fascine